Dylan Salvador (born 20 May 1993) is a French mixed martial artist and former Muay Thai kickboxer. A professional competitor since 2011, Salvador is a former two-weight WAKO World champion, having held the low-kick titles at light welterweight and welterweight, and is the 2016 Glory Lightweight Contender Tournament Winner.

As of 25 April 2017, he was the #9 ranked lightweight in the world by LiverKick.com.

Mixed martial arts career
Salvador made his mixed martial arts debut against Kenny Porter at Titan FC 54 on April 26, 2019. He won the fight by a third-round submission.

Salvador faced John Morehouse at NFC 131 on April 17, 2021. He won the fight by a second-round submission.

Salvador faced Joshua Anderson at XFN 373 on August 15, 2021. He won the fight by a first-round submission.

Salvador faced Ali Zebian at Premier FC 31 on September 18, 2021, in the final of the one-night Tournament of Champions after winning against Estevan Payne and Anthony Spike via unanimous and split decision. He lost the fight against Zebian via split decision.

Salvador faced Arman Ospanov on January 28, 2022, at Eagle FC 44. He won the fight via TKO due to a corner stoppage between the second and third round.

Salvador faced Jakhongir Jumaev on October 20, 2022 at UAE Warriors 34. He won the bout via Von Flue choke in the third round.

Glory
Dylan Salvador won his first two fights at Glory 36 Oberhausen Germany during the 4 men Lightweight Contender Tournament.

Salvador will fight Sittichai Sitsongpeenong for the Glory lightweight title on March 25, 2017, in Brussels, Belgium at Glory 39. It will be the third fight between the two.

Titles and accomplishments
 Glory
 2016 Glory Lightweight (-70 kg/154.3 lb) Contender Tournament Winner
 World Association of Kickboxing Organizations
 2016 WAKO Pro 66.7 kg World Champion
 2014 WAKO Pro 63.5 kg World Champion

Mixed martial arts record

|-
|Win
|align=center|5–1
|Jakhongir Jumaev
|Submission (shoulder choke)
|UAE Warriors 34
|
|align=center|3
|align=center|2:42
|Abu Dhabi, United Arab Emirates
|-
|Win
|align=center|4–1
|Arman Ospanov
|TKO (corner stoppage)
|Eagle FC 44
|
|align=center|2
|align=center|5:00
|Miami, Florida, United States
|
|-
|Loss
|align=center|3–1
|Ali Zebian
|Decision (split)
|Premier FC 31
|
|align=center|3
|align=center|5:00
|Springfield, Massachusetts, United States
|
|-
|Win
|align=center|3–0
|Joshua Anderson
|Submission (rear-naked choke)
|XFN 373
|
|align=center|1
|align=center|4:50
|Tulsa, Oklahoma, United States
|-
|Win
|align=center|2–0
|John Morehouse
|Submission (rear-naked choke)
|NFC 131
|
|align=center|2
|align=center|1:10
|Atlanta, Georgia, United States
|
|-
|Win
|align=center|1–0
|Kenny Porter
|Submission (anaconda choke)
|Titan FC 54
|
|align=center|3
|align=center|1:04
|Fort Lauderdale, Florida, United States
|

Mixed martial arts exhibition record

|-
|Win
|align=center|2–0
|Anthony Spike
|Decision (split)
|Premier FC 31
|
|align=center|1
|align=center|5:00
|Springfield, Massachusetts, United States
|
|-
|Win
|align=center|1–0
|Estevan Payan
|Decision (unanimous)
|Premier FC 31
|
|align=center|1
|align=center|5:00
|Springfield, Massachusetts, United States
|

Muay Thai & Kickboxing record

|-  style="background:#fbb;"
| 2019-07-27 || Loss||align=left| Liu Yaning || Wu Lin Feng 2019: WLF -67kg World Cup 2019-2020 2nd Group Stage  || Zhengzhou, China || TKO (Punches) || 2||2:00
|-
|-  style="background:#fbb;"
|  2019-06-13 || Loss || align="left" | Sorin Căliniuc || SAS Gym 02, Semi Finals || Bucharest, Romania || Decision (split) || 3 || 3:00
|-
|-  style="background:#cfc;"
| 2018-12-15 || Win||align=left| Phetprajak Sor Jor Somsak || La Nuit Des Challenges || France || TKO (Doctor Stoppage/Cut) || 2 || 1:22
|-  style="background:#c5d2ea
| 2018-11-17|| Draw||align=left| Pavel Grishanovic || Hearts On Fire|| Italy || Draw  || 3 || 3:00
|-  style="background:#fbb;"
| 2018-02-27 || Loss ||align=left| Rafi Bohic || Lumpinee Stadium - Best Of Siam || Thailand || KO (Elbow) || 4 ||  
|-
! style=background:white colspan=9 |
|-  style="background:#fbb;"
| 2017-12-23 || Loss ||align=left| Qiu Jianliang || Glory of Heroes: Jinan - GOH 65 kg Championship Tournament, Finals || Jinan, China || Decision (Unanimous) || 3 || 3:00
|-
! style=background:white colspan=9 |For the 2017 GOH Featherweight (-65kg) World Champion.
|-  style="background:#cfc;"
| 2017-12-23 || Win ||align=left| Giga Chikadze || Glory of Heroes: Jinan - GOH 65 kg Championship Tournament, Semi-Finals || Jinan, China || Ex. R Decision (Unanimous) || 4 || 3:00
|-
|-  style="background:#cfc;"
| 2017-10-28 || Win||align=left| Massaro Glunder || Glory 47: Lyon || Lyon, France || Decision (unanimous) || 3 || 3:00
|-
|-  style="background:#fbb;"
| 2017-06-10 || Loss ||align=left| Serhiy Adamchuk || Glory 42: Paris|| Paris, France || Decision (unanimous)  || 3 || 3:00
|-
|-  style="background:#fbb;"
| 2017-03-25 || Loss ||align=left| Sitthichai Sitsongpeenong || Glory 39: Brussels || Brussels, Belgium || TKO (Knee to the Body) || 4 ||  2:58
|-
! style=background:white colspan=9 |
|-  style="background:#cfc;"
| 2016-12-10 || Win||align=left| Hysni Beqiri || Glory 36: Oberhausen - Lightweight Contender Tournament, Final  || Oberhausen, Germany || Decision (Unanimous) || 3 || 3:00
|-
! style=background:white colspan=9 |
|-  style="background:#CCFFCC;"
| 2016-12-10 || Win||align=left| Anatoly Moiseev || Glory 36: Oberhausen - Lightweight Contender Tournament, Semi Finals  || Oberhausen, Germany || Decision (Majority) || 3 || 3:00
|-  style="background:#CCFFCC;"
| 2016-10-22|| Win||align=left| Manaowan Sitsongpeenong || La Nuit Des Challenges 16  || Lyon, France || Decision  || 5 || 3:00
|-  style="background:#fbb;"
| 2016-09-24 || Loss ||align=left| Buakaw Banchamek || Kunlun Fight 53 - Muay Thai 70kg Championship || Beijing, China || Decision || 3 || 3:00 
|-
! style=background:white colspan=9 |
|-  style="background:#CCFFCC;"
| 2016-08-04|| Win||align=left| Roman Babaev ||  Fight Night St. Tropez || France || KO (Left Body Punch) || 2  || 2:30
|-  style="background:#CCFFCC;"
| 2016-06-24|| Win||align=left| Aleksei Fedoseev || Monte Carlo Fighting Masters || Monte Carlo, Monaco || TKO (Referee Stoppage/ Low Kicks) || 4 || 1:48
|-
! style=background:white colspan=9 |
|-  style="background:#fbb;"
| 2016-05-19|| Loss||align=left| Saensatharn P.K. Saenchai Muaythaigym || Capital Fights || Paris, France || Decision || 5 || 3:00
|-
! style=background:white colspan=9 |
|-  style="background:#CCFFCC;"
| 2015-11-14|| Win||align=left| Philippe Salmon || Nuit des Champions 2015 || France || KO (Left Body Knee) || 2  || 1:20
|-  style="background:#fbb;"
| 2015-07-04 || Loss ||align=left| Makihira Keita || K-1 World GP 2015 -70kg Championship Tournament, Quarter Finals || Tokyo, Japan || Decision (Unanimous) || 3 || 3:00
|-  style="background:#CCFFCC;"
| 2015-05-02 || Win ||align=left| Sitthichai Sitsongpeenong || Kunlun Fight 24 || Verona, Italy || Decision (unanimous) || 3 || 3:00
|-  style="background:#fbb;"
| 2014-12-13 || Loss||align=left| Sitthichai Sitsongpeenong || Victory 2, K-1 Rules || Levallois, France ||  Decision || 3 || 3:00
|-  style="background:#c5d2ea
| 2014-11-15|| Draw||align=left| Saensatharn P.K. Saenchai Muaythaigym || Top King World Series|| France || Draw  || 3 || 3:00
|-  style="background:#fbb;"
| 2014-10-05 || Loss ||align=left| Aikpracha Meenayothin || Kunlun Fight 11 - World MAX 2014 Final 8 || Macao, China || Decision || 3 || 3:00
|-  style="background:#CCFFCC;"
| 2014-07-27 || Win ||align=left|  Seyedisa Alamdarnezam || Kunlun Fight 7 - World MAX 2014 Final 16 || Zhoukou, China || Decision(Unanimous) || 3 || 3:00
|-  style="background:#fbb;"
| 2014-06-14 || Loss ||align=left| Ekarit Mor Krungthep Thonburi || Monte Carlo Fighting Masters 2014  || Monte Carlo, Monaco || Decision (Split) || 5 || 3:00
|-
! style=background:white colspan=9 |
|-  style="background:#CCFFCC;"
| 2014-04-12|| Win ||align=left|  Amine Attalhaoui || Championnat du Monde de Boxe Thai || France || TKO  || 3 || 
|-
! style=background:white colspan=9 |
|-  style="background:#fbb;"
| 2013-12-10 || Loss ||align=left| Victor Nagbe ||Max Muaythai - The Final Chapter Tournament, Semi Final  || Khon Kaen, Thailand || Decision || 3 || 3:00
|-  style="background:#fbb;"
| 2013-11-02 || Loss ||align=left| Liam Harrison || The Main Event 2013 || Manchester, England || Decision (unanimous) || 5 || 3:00
|-  style="background:#fbb;"
| 2013-10-06 || Loss ||align=left| Jingreedtong Seatransferry || Max Muay Thai Sendai Qualifying Tournament Final  || Sendai, Japan || Decision  || 3 || 3:00
|-
! style=background:white colspan=9 |
|-  style="background:#CCFFCC;"
| 2013-10-06 || Win ||align=left| Yuya Yamato || Max Muay Thai Sendai Qualifying Tournament Semi Finals|| Sendai, Japan || Decision  || 3 || 3:00
|-  style="background:#fbb;"
| 2013-09-07 || Loss ||align=left| Kem Sitsongpeenong || Millenium Team Fight || La Réunion || Decision (Split)  || 5 || 3:00
|-
! style=background:white colspan=9 |
|-  style="background:#fbb;"
| 2013-05-06 || Loss ||align=left| Kem Sitsongpeenong || MAX Muay Thai 1 || Surin, Thailand || Decision (unanimous) || 3 || 3:00
|-  style="background:#CCFFCC;"
| 2013-03-02 || Win|| align=left| Kaew Fairtex || Warriors Night 1 || Paris, France || Decision (Unanimous) || 5 || 3:00
|-  style="background:#CCFFCC;"
| 2012-11-20 || Win|| align=left|  Hafed Romdhane || A1 WCC Muay Thai || France || KO || 4 ||
|-  style="background:#CCFFCC;"
| 2012-10-20 ||Win||align=left| Saiyok Pumpanmuang || Roschtigrabe Derby || Switzerland || TKO (knee injury) || 1 || 3:00
|-  style="background:#CCFFCC;"
| 2012-09-19|| Win|| align=left|  Sidi Koite || Thai Fight Lyon || Lyon, France || TKO || 2 ||
|-  style="background:#CCFFCC;"
| 2012-08-17|| Win|| align=left|  Soloman Wickstead || Thai Fight England || Leicester, England || Decision || 3 || 3:00
|-  style="background:#CCFFCC;"
| 2012-06-02|| Win|| align=left|  Angelo Campoli || La Nuit de Challenges|| France || TKO|| 1 ||
|-  style="background:#CCFFCC;"
| 2012-05-04|| Win|| align=left|  Mhand Boukkedim|| King of the Ring|| France || KO|| 3 ||
|-  style="background:#FFBBBB;"
| 2011-12-10|| Loss|| align=left|  Alessio D'Angelo|| International Fight Show 2011|| Italy || Decision || 3 || 3:00
|-
| colspan=9 | Legend:

References
15. DYLAN SALVADOR'S DEBUTS AT GLORY badboy.com Retrieved 2016-03-21

1993 births
French Muay Thai practitioners
French practitioners of Brazilian jiu-jitsu
Living people
French male kickboxers
Sportspeople from Lyon
Kunlun Fight kickboxers
French male mixed martial artists
Mixed martial artists utilizing Muay Thai
Mixed martial artists utilizing Brazilian jiu-jitsu